KBRW-FM is a non-commercial radio station in Utqiaġvik, Alaska, broadcasting on 91.9 MHz FM, and is located at 1695 Okpik Street, in a building that also contains studios for KBRW/680. The FM station airs public radio programming from the National Public Radio and WFMT networks.  KBRW-FM also airs locally originated programming.

KBRW-FM broadcasts in stereo from a single transmitter and antenna located in Barrow, Alaska, and does not employ translator/relay stations or internet streaming.

KBRW-FM is licensed to broadcast in the HD (hybrid) format.

KBRW's format is a variety of public radio, public and native affairs, religious programming, and popular music.

Gallery

References

External links

BRW-FM
NPR member stations
Native American radio
North Slope Borough, Alaska
BRW-FM
Utqiagvik, Alaska